Windsor Farms is a 20th-century neighborhood in Richmond, Virginia, of primarily Colonial Revival design.

Designed in 1926, Windsor Farms is one of Richmond's first planned neighborhoods. It was designed to look like an English village, with curvy streets and English names like Dover, Canterbury, Berkshire, and so on. There are a variety of architectural styles, the most common being Colonial Revival and Cape Cod. Windsor Farms has a couple of historical buildings, including Virginia House and Agecroft Hall. Windsor Farms borders Cary Street Road to the north, the Downtown Expressway to the east, the James River and several areas to the south, and the neighborhoods of Lockgreen and Westmoreland Place to the west.

Historic houses in the neighborhood include Virginia House and Agecroft Hall, both moved from England in the 20th century. Another is "The Oaks" which was built by Benjamin Harrison IV in 1745 and moved from nearby Amelia County, Virginia in 1927.

Several high-end, architecturally significant houses were designed by Virginia-born Duncan Lee and William Lawrence Bottomley of New York.

Architecture 

Like most of the Greater Richmond Region, Windsor Farms exhibits an emphasis of colonial revival architecture and Tudor architecture. Much of the influence lends its way to two historical homes in the neighborhood: Virginia House and Agecroft Hall. Virginia House was actually constructed in England in the 16th century prior to the existence of colonial Virginia. At the time of Windsor Farms' construction, the house was auctioned off and shipped across the Atlantic Ocean.

Layout 
Windsor Farms was one of the first communities in Richmond built with the automobile in mind. The layout of Windsor Farms contains a partial grid that is characterized by curvy roads, and one major road that rings around the neighborhood. The main road through the community is Dover Road, a divided avenue that connects the eastern and western ends of the community together. The street allows east-west access to neighboring communities such as Stadium, Rothesay, Lockgreen, and Near West End. The primary ring road for the neighborhood is Canterbury Road. Exeter Road offers direct access to Carytown while Coventry Road offers direct access to Mary Munford.

The center of the community is characterized by the Grace Baptist Church and the "Church Green", which serves a meeting center for the neighborhood.

References

External links
Agecroft Hall
Virginia House

Neighborhoods in Richmond, Virginia